FBL may refer to:

Commerce 
 Family Bank, a Kenyan bank
 Faysal Bank, a Pakistani bank
 FBL Financial Group, an American financial holding company

Other uses 
 Biblis station, in Hesse, Germany
 Bolivarian Forces of Liberation
 Collège des Frères (Bab al-Louq), a school in Cairo, Egypt
 Facebook Live, a live streaming service from Facebook
 Faribault Municipal Airport (IATA code), an airport in Minnesota
 Feedback loop (email)
 Fibrillarin, a human enzyme
 Floorball League, a video game
 Friends of the British Library, a British charity
 FUFA Big League, a Ugandan football league
 West Albay Bikol language, spoken in the Philippines